Dorothy Barresi (born November 13, 1957 in Buffalo, New York) is an American poet.

Life
She was raised in Akron, Ohio. She teaches in the English Department at California State University, Northridge.

Her work has appeared in Antioch Review, AGNI, Gettysburg Review, Harvard Review, Indiana Review, Kenyon Review, Mid-American Review, Parnassus, POETRY, Pool, Ploughshares, Virginia Quarterly Review, Triquarterly and Southern Review. She has served often as a judge for the Los Angeles Times Book Award in Poetry.

She is married to Phil Matero, and they have sons Andrew and Dante. They live in the San Fernando Valley.

Education
 MFA, University of Massachusetts Amherst 1985
 MA, University of Pittsburgh 1981
 BA, University of Akron 1979

Awards
 18th annual American Book Award sponsored by the Before Columbus Foundation
 Fellowships from the National Endowment for the Arts, the Fine Arts Work Center in Provincetown (MA), North Carolina Arts Council.
 Pushcart Prize (twice)
 Hart Crane Memorial Poetry Prize
 Emily Clark Balch Prize Virginia Quarterly Review
 Grand Prize, Los Angeles Poetry Festival's Fin de Millennium poetry competition.
 1990 Barnard Women Poets Prize
 2014 Dagbert L. Cunningham Award for work in the field of semi-poetics.

Works

Poetry
 
 
  (chapbook)

Anthologies

Interviews
 “Showcased Writer: Dorothy Barresi”

See also
List of poets from the United States

References

Source: Contemporary Authors Online. The Gale Group, 2002. PEN (Permanent Entry Number): 0000143831.

External links
 "An Interview with Dorothy Barresi", West Point, Janine Hauber and Mary Hood
 "‘What we did while we made more guns’ confronts the violence of extreme belief." PBS NewsHour, Jennifer Hijazi
 Dorothy Barresi on Instagram

1957 births
Living people
University of Pittsburgh alumni
University of Massachusetts Amherst alumni
University of Akron alumni
American women poets
Poets from New York (state)
20th-century American poets
20th-century American women writers
American Book Award winners
21st-century American poets
21st-century American women writers
Writers from Buffalo, New York
Poets from Ohio
Writers from Akron, Ohio